Jim Burke, known professionally as Mr.B The Gentleman Rhymer, is a British parodist who performs "chap hop" — hip hop delivered in a Received Pronunciation accent.  Mr.B raps, or "rhymes", about good manners, dressing with style and dignity, sophisticated society, pipe smoking and cricket while playing the banjolele. The character is described as having grown up in Cheam and attending Sutton Grammar School for Boys.

Background
Mr.B The Gentleman Rhymer is an alter ego of Jim Burke, a rapper with the Britpop group Collapsed Lung whose most famous song was 'Eat My Goal'. Burke started performing as Mr.B in late 2007, playing at cabaret clubs, and venues across the UK including the Glastonbury Festival and club NME in Paris, and performed as part of the 2010 Edinburgh Fringe Festival. He has performed on radio including the Steve Lamacq show and "Introducing with Tom Robinson" for the BBC. He has also been named as a 'Band of the Month' on the Kooba Radio podcast.

His debut album "Flattery Not Included" was released in 2008 for the Grot Music label, which includes the track "Chap-Hop History" which is a Received Pronunciation reworking of some well-known hip hop classics.  Its accompanying video has received over 1.5 million views on YouTube.  Another track from the album, "Timothy", is about the unique vocal style of BBC Radio's Tim Westwood. Perhaps his best-known track, "Straight Out of Surrey", is a parody of N.W.A's "Straight Outta Compton" and purports to show "the extent of [his] cricket knowledge."

Mr.B has appeared as a guest on the Zero Day album by MC Frontalot, playing the banjolele and providing additional vocals on the track "Better at Rapping".

He and fellow "chap-hop" artist Professor Elemental were jokingly engaged in a feud for some time. However, Professor Elemental had a short appearance in Mr.B's music video for the song "Just Like a Chap", of which Professor Elemental said "Much as I hate to admit it, I bloody love that video and am jolly glad [Mr. B] let me gate crash." The "feud" was settled on Professor Elemental's 2012 album Father Of Invention on the track "The Duel," on which Mr. B appeared, and they have made occasional appearances together since.

As well as his work as The Gentleman Rhymer, Burke has also released works of "chapstep" under the name Mr.B The Gentleman Selector, and self-described "terribly English electronica" as The Major.

Discography

Studio albums 
 Flattery Not Included (2008)
 I Say! (2010)
 The Tweed Album (2012)
 Can't Stop, Shan't Stop (2013)
 Mr.B's Christmas Album (2015)
 There's a Rumpus Going On (2016)
 Dandinista (2019)
 A Thoroughly Modern Existential Crisis (2020)
 Chop Happy: Mashups And Bootlegs Volume One (2021)

Compilations 
 O.G. Original Gentleman (2011) (Digital release / Released on CD in 2013)
 Acid Ragtime: Chapstep Volume One (2014)
 Chapstep, Vol. 2: Olde Jack Swing (2017)

Singles & EPs 
 Oh, Santa! (2012)
 The Chap Trilogy (EP) (2016)
 Paper Plates (EP) (2018)
 I'm Getting The Blame For Christmas (EP) (2020)

References

External links
Mr.B The Gentleman Rhymer's homepage

Year of birth missing (living people)
Place of birth missing (living people)
Living people
People educated at Sutton Grammar School
English male singer-songwriters
Musical groups established in 2007
Musicians from Brighton and Hove